Hugh Acheson (born November 5, 1971) is a Canadian-born chef and restaurateur. He owns four restaurants in Georgia, and serves as a judge on the reality cooking competition show Top Chef, and as an Iron Chef on Iron Chef Canada.

Early life

Acheson was born on November 5, 1971, in Ottawa, Ontario, Canada. The youngest of four children, Acheson has three older sisters. His father was a professor of economics at Ottawa's Carleton University, while his mother was a reading tutor. Acheson's parents divorced when he was young, and he was raised primarily by his father in the Manor Park and Centretown neighbourhoods of Ottawa, with the exception of two years that he spent living with his mother and stepfather in the American cities of Clemson, South Carolina, and Atlanta, Georgia.

Career

Acheson took his first kitchen job when he was fifteen years old, as a dishwasher at Ottawa's Bank Street Café. He subsequently worked at other well-known Ottawa restaurants, before moving to Montreal, Quebec, to attend Concordia University. There he studied political philosophy, but he soon dropped out to work in Italian restaurants in Montreal. In 1994, Acheson moved back to Ottawa with his future wife, Mary Koon, and began working at Café Henry Burger, an iconic restaurant that closed in the 2000s after over 80 years of operation. At Henry Burger, Acheson learned about French cuisine, wine and etiquette under chef Rob McDonald. Later in the 1990s, Acheson moved with his wife from Ottawa to her hometown of Athens, Georgia so she could attend graduate school at the University of Georgia.

On the basis of his experience in French and Italian cuisine, Acheson became the head chef and manager at the Last Resort Grill upon moving to Athens. Following his wife's graduation, the couple moved to San Francisco, California, where Acheson took a job at restaurant Mecca. He subsequently worked as a sous chef for San Francisco chef Gary Danko, helping him to open his eponymous restaurant. After approximately two years in San Francisco, Acheson and his wife returned to Athens at the request of Melissa Clegg, the owner of Last Resort, who wanted Acheson to help her open a restaurant. In turn, Acheson opened his first restaurant, Five & Ten, in Athens in 2000. He was named one of the best new chefs in the United States by Food & Wine magazine in 2002. Acheson opened his second Athens restaurant, The National, in 2007. His third eatery, Empire State South, opened in Atlanta in 2010. Empire State South closed it's doors in February, 2023. Cinco y Diez, a modern Mexican restaurant in Athens, was only open from January to October 2014. In 2015 Acheson opened Spiller Park, a coffee shop in Ponce City Market. On February 2, 2021, Acheson's latest culinary business Ovide is slated to open its doors as Hotel Effie’s signature restaurant.

Television
In 2011, Acheson competed on season 3 of Top Chef Masters, a reality competition show in which experienced celebrity chefs compete against each other in various challenges. He was eliminated in the first round, but subsequently returned in the second episode after another chef withdrew. He ultimately finished in fifth place out of twelve competitors. He was then invited to become a judge on season 9 of Top Chef, of which Top Chef Masters is a spin-off. Top Chef is a cooking competition show in which lesser-known chefs compete and are judged by more experienced chefs. Season 9 aired from November 2011 to February 2012. Acheson also served as a judge on season 10 of Top Chef, which ran November 2012 to February 2013.
In 2013, he returned as a judge on Top Chef season 11 and as host and judge of "Battle of the Sous Chefs", a component of season 5 of Top Chef Masters.

In 2020 he appeared as a judge on the Food Network Canada competition series Wall of Chefs.

Books
Acheson published his first cookbook, A New Turn in the South: Southern Flavors Reinvented for Your Kitchen, in 2011. The book was awarded the 2012 James Beard Foundation award for "Best Cookbook in American Cooking." He was also co-winner of the 2012 James Beard Award for best chef, Southeast. Hugh published his second cookbook, entitled Pick a Pickle: 50 recipes for Pickles, Relishes and Fermented Snacks, in the spring of 2014. His third cookbook was released in the spring of 2015 under the title The Broad Fork. In the fall of 2017, his fourth cookbook was published, The Chef and the Slow Cooker. In his fifth cookbook, Sous Vide: Better Home Cooking, published in October 2019, Acheson introduces many home cooks to the sous vide method of food preparation with 90 recipes to choose from.

Personal life

Acheson was married to Mary Koon, a Georgia native who worked as an editor at the Georgia Museum of Art. They first met in middle school, when Acheson briefly lived in South Carolina with his mother. They reconnected while at university in Canada, and married two years later. Acheson and Koon divorced quietly in 2017 and both still live in Athens, Georgia.  They have two daughters, Beatrice and The Clementine.

Books

Sous Vide: Better Home Cooking
The Chef and the Slow Cooker
A New Turn in the South: Southern Flavors Reinvented for Your Kitchen
Pick a Pickle: 50 Recipes for Pickles, Relishes, and Fermented Snacks
The Broad Fork: Recipes for the Wide World of Vegetables and Fruits

References

External links
 Hugh Acheson Interview

1971 births
Businesspeople from Ottawa
Canadian expatriates in the United States
Canadian restaurateurs
Canadian television chefs
Canadian cookbook writers
James Beard Foundation Award winners
Living people
Writers from Ottawa
Canadian male chefs